AK 47, Akay 47, Ak Fortyseven, AkayFourtyseven birth name Emmanuel Mayanja  (October 29, 1990 – March 16, 2015) was a Ugandan Dancehall artist, he rose to fame in 2012 with his song "Champion". He is said to be one of the best dancehall musicians Uganda has ever had. He died on 16 March 2015 in a mysterious death.

Early life and career
Ak 47 was born to Gerald Mayanja, who hails from Busato Mityana but lives in Seguku Kampala, he was a biological brother to famous Ugandan musicians Chameleone, Pallaso and Weasel of Goodlyfe Crew.

Education Background
AK attended Kisubi high school for his secondary education where he completed A Level from.

AK47 started singing in 2008, by then his stage name was Hammatone. His very first song was produced at Studio One and the music video was produced by popular Ugandan DJ Erycom. He started singing in Leone Island group which is managed by his brother Chameleone with his first song Usiende in 2008  however this song did not get enough air play on Ugandan radios and TV, he came to limelight in 2011 when he made a remix of Bayuda with his brother Jose Chameleone.
This gave him popularity and much fan base in Uganda.
Since then he continued with more other good songs such as Mbeera ya nsi and Champion which topped Ugandan music chats for so long, Kidandali, Kaleba with his brother Chameleone, Musajja watu with King Saha and many others. 
In 2014 he joined the group Team No Sleep which is managed and owned Jeff Kiwa.
In 2012, AK 47 married his wife Maggie Mayanja and they had two children (twins).

Discography
 Usiende
 Bayunda Remix feat. Chameleone
 Champion
 Kidandali
 Mbera ya nsi
 Mussajja watu with King Saha
 Ndi Mulokole
?AK 47

Death
AK47 had recorded his latest song Ndi Mulokole, On 16 March, his last day, he went on and posted on his Facebook page saying "Nze Ndi Mulokole Nafuuka Mulokole AK Mulokole Naawe Fuuka Mulokole In God we trust" (I am saved, i received salvation, AK is saved, you also get saved In God we trust) little did he know that it will be his last update to the public.
Around 8:00PM, AK 47 went to the bar of his manager Jeff Kiwa, called Denjavu which is found in Kampala, where he started drinking with friends.
At around 10:PM, AK 47 was found lying on the floor of the bathrooms bleeding from the nose and with foam in his mouth. It was said that he went unconscious and fainted. He was taken to the nearest clinic for first aid but the clinic was unable to deal with the difficult situation and instead referred  him to a bigger hospital. They reached Nsambya Hospital and the doctors found it impossible to cure his complication. He was announced dead five minutes after arriving in the hospital.

They called his brothers Chameleone and Pallaso who arrived in a hurry. They informed the media and at around 11PM news had started circulating all over social media. The nurses prepared his body and took it to the mortuary.

Witnesses
Different versions came from witnesses who were around the Dejavu bar that night. According to one girl, AK 47 had a quarrel with his manager Jeff Kiwa over a laptop: AK 47 wanted to play his new song Ndi Mulokole (I am saved), a thing that Jeff Kiwa never wanted, claiming that the laptop had no battery. After exchanging some words, AK 47 went to the bathroom; the bouncer was seen following AK 47 to the bathroom. After a few minutes the bouncer of the bar was seen coming out of the bathroom and when they couldn't see AK 47 coming out, they decided to check there and they found him lying on the floor half dead; they believe that he was beaten and killed by the bouncer.

Others said that AK 47 left the bar and went outside to get in his car and go home. However, he was seen with blood in his nose which they believe that he had been beaten by the bouncer before; then he went to the bathroom to clean himself of the blood. Then the bouncer followed him there again and after the bouncer came out of the bathroom, when they checked in the bathroom after several minutes, they found AK 47 lying on the bathroom helpless. Both witnesses believe that after entering the bathroom, he was followed by the bouncer, so it is believed that the bouncer was the one who killed him. Many believe that the bouncer was working on the orders of someone above him.

Other Stories
Immediately after his death, some reports, came claiming that it is the ghost of Karamaji that strangled AK 47 to death, Karamaji is a boy who had died in 2012 and his death was related to the Mayanja Family since he burnt dead in the compound of AK 47's brother's house however, the claims were dismissed by the police since they had no source and authentication.

Another group who claimed to be from Illuminati claimed to have been responsible for taking AK 47's family, according to them, AK 47 has been part of their team for so long and that they had helped him get fame and popularity and that he had betrayed them by declaring that he is saved, in his last Facebook post, so they had to punish him. However, police dismissed the claims too saying that they are trying to alter and divert the investigations of the police on the real cause of AK 47's death.

Impact
After AK 47's death, news spread everywhere on social media. Facebook and Twitter in Uganda were full of condolence messages, famous Ugandan radios and TV Stations interrupted their daily schedules to break the sad news about the fallen hero. Hundreds of fans had already reached the place where he had died, mourning alongside his brothers Chameleone and Pallaso and Various artists including Bebe Cool, Diamond Oscar, Sheebah Karungi and many others. Bebe Cool posted a condolence message on his Facebook page, followed by Chameleone and Pallaso. Later many other Ugandan celebrities and social bloggers posted their condolence messages including Eddy Kenzo, Juliana Kanyomozi, Bobi Wine, Sheebah Karungi, Nobert Mao and many others. Davido also posted a condolence message, various Kenyan and Tanzanian celebs also posted their condolence messages.

Bobi Wine was on his South Africa tour but he cancelled all the remaining concerts and came back to Uganda.

His death was equated to the death of great Ugandan musicians like Philly Lutaaya, Paulo Kafeero and Elly Wamala.

Diamond Oscar and Dj Bobby who worked at Dejavu bar were arrested to help police in investigations however they were released the following day after making statements to the police. Jeff Kiwa and Sheebah Karungi also made their statements to the police. The bouncer of the bar went missing and the bar cleaner who is believed to have witnessed AK 47's death also went missing.

Chameleone composed a song, a tribute to his fallen brother, titled "Tubasonyiwe" (Lets forgive them).
Later a group of musicians from Uganda composed a song as a tribute to AK 47 titled "Rest in Peace AK 47" these included  Eddy Kenzo, Young Mulo, Big Eye, Lyto Boss, Denis Bitone, Spice Diana, and Aziz Azion. This was followed by a tribute from his brother Pallaso titled Mubambazanga.

References

1990 births
2015 deaths
Ugandan singer-songwriters
21st-century Ugandan male singers